Federico Sanvitale (Fontanellato, 19 May 1704 – Brescia, 8 December 1761) was an Italian mathematician and Jesuit that marked a pivot moment for the growth of Brescia's scientific culture.

Works

References

18th-century Italian Jesuits
18th-century Italian mathematicians
1761 deaths
1704 births
Scientists from Brescia